Sithembile is an African masculine given name. Notable people with the name include:

Sithembile Gumbo (1962/1963–2019), Zimbabwean politician
Sithembile Langa (born 1995), South African cricketer
Sithembile Makongolo (born 1985), South African cricketer

African masculine given names